"Silent Night" is a popular Christmas carol.

Silent Night(s) may also refer to:

Film and television 
 Silent Night (1995 film), a Swiss-German drama
 Silent Night (1996 film), a Nigerian film
 Silent Night (2002 film), a fact-based television movie set on Christmas Eve in 1944
 Silent Night (2012 film), a horror film starring Malcolm McDowell
 Silent Night (2021 film), a British-American dark comedy film set at Christmas
 Silent Night, an upcoming American film by John Woo
 "Silent Night", an episode of the television series CSI: NY  (season 3)
 "Silent Night", an episode of the television series Haven  (season 2)

Music 
 Silent Night (album), a 1996 album by The Necks
 The Silent Night EP, a 2009 EP by Seabird
 Silent Nights, a 1985 album by Rick Wakeman
 "Silent Night" (Bon Jovi song), 1986
 Silent Night (opera), 2011
 Silent Nights, a 2008 EP by Scott Matthew
 "7 O'Clock News/Silent Night", a 1966 song by Simon & Garfunkel

Other 
Silent-Night-Chapel, a monument where the Christmas carol was first performed.
 "Silent Night", 1994 issue of comics series Sin City, see list of Sin City yarns
 Silent Night, an annual basketball game at Taylor University

See also
Silentnight, British manufacturer of beds and mattresses 
Silent Knight (disambiguation)